Leucae or Leukae may refer to:
Souda (island) and Leon (Souda Bay), islands off Crete
Loches, France
Leucae (Ionia), ancient city now located in Turkey
Leucae (Laconia), ancient city of Laconia, Greece

See also
Leukai (disambiguation)